Tupua (known as Tupua Tamasese) is a state dynasty and one of the four paramount chiefly titles of Samoa, known as the Tama-a-Aiga or 'Sons of the Great Families'). It is the titular head of one of Samoa's two great royal families - Sā Tupua, the lineage of Queen Salamasina. The 'Tupua' refers to Salamasina's descendant, King Tupua Fuiavailili, who was the first to unite both of Salamasina's descent lines in his personage and ascended to the Kingship of Samoa in c.1550, upon the death of his adoptive father, King Muagututi'a. Tupua Fuiavailili was adopted by his aunt, Fenunu'ivao (daughter of Leutele and wife of King Muagututi'a) and named as the King's successor. Tupua's rise also led to the first usage of the term "Tama-a-'aiga" by the orator polity of Leulumoega and Lufilufi, in reference to his many genealogical connections to the great families of Ātua. The 'Tamasese' part refers to his descendant Tupua Tamasese Titimaea, whose prowess in battle and generosity won favour with many of his followers and whose actions restored the Salamasina line's prestige. All subsequent Tupua title holders have thus carried the two names together since then.

The seat of the Tupua Tamasese title is at Mulinu'u ma Sepolata'emo in Lufilufi. Three political families make up Sa Tupua: Aiga o Mavaega, Aiga Sā Tuala and Aiga Sā Fenunuivao. The Aiga Sā Fenunuivao of Falefa and Salani holds authority and custodianship of the title, deciding who from among the heirs it is bestowed upon.

The current holder is His Highness Tui Atua Tupua Tamasese Efi, the former Prime Minister and former Head of State of Samoa.

Royalty: The Tama-a-'aiga & Pāpā Titles 
Tama-a-Aiga titles are the maximal lineage titles of Samoa. These titles are often associated with Pāpā titles, paramount district titles which affords the holder authority over an entire region or sovereignty over all of Samoa (if one acquires all four pāpā). The field of contention for the papa titles and tafa'ifa was confined to the leading members of two families, Sa Tupua and Sa Malietoa, under whom all Samoa is united. The leading tides of these two family lineages were called tama'aiga (sons of families). By mid-19th century, the tama-a-aiga Tupua Tamasese of Sa Tupua and Malietoa of Sa Malietoa were joined by two more titles Mata'afa and Tuimaleali'ifano as the four highest titleholders of Samoa. All (except Sa Malietoa) are descended from Queen Salamasina, the daughter of Tui A'ana Tamalelagi and a descendant of the Tu'i Tonga. She became the first sovereign of all Samoa.

Throughout most of Samoa's history, the root cause of civil unrest was the struggle for titular supremacy among these families.The senior of the two, Sa Tupua dominated the office since the time of its titular ancestor, Queen Salamasina, in the 1500s. Sa Malietoa rejoined at the beginning of the 19th century, coinciding with the collapse of Manono's dominance and the arrival of British missionaries.

Both the Tama-a-Aiga Tupua Tamasese title and the pāpā  Tui Atua mantle are currently held by Samoa's former Prime Minister and Head of State, His Highness Tui Atua Tupua Tamasese Efi.

Origins of Tupua 
The origins of the Tupua (later Tupua Tamasese) title is found in the genealogical line of succession tracing back to the rule of Queen Salamasina. Her descendant, Fonoti, won the civil war that led to his installation as King of Samoa. His son and successor, Muagututi'a, married Fenunu'ivao, daughter of Leutele of Falefa. Because they had no children of their own, they adopted Fenunivao's nephew Fuiavailili (son of Fuimaono of Salani) as their son. As the successor of King Muagututi'a, the orators of Tumua - the orator polity of Upolu based in Lufilufi and Leulumoega - questioned who this child was to assume such an important mantle and whether he possessed the necessary genealogical links to the great families of Samoa in order to be worthy. This inquiry is known as when "na saesae laufa'i ai Tumua" (lit. when Tumua systematically 'ripped the leaves of the banana tree' to examine the child's lineage).

 "E tua Mulinu'u ia Falenu'utapu, tatala le lafo o Manuō. E tua Vainiu i Aleipatalemele, tatala le lafo o Molio'o. E tua Vaie'e i Nofopule, tatala le lafo o Iuli. E tua Vailiili i Laloaoa, tatala le lafo o Moe'ono. Toe tua Vailiili i Salani ma Olofesula, tatala le lafo o Tofua'iofoa. Tua o Salani ma Olofesula i Falefasa, tatala le lafo o Talolema'agao. Toe tua o Falefasa i Faleniu ma Faletoi i Saoluafata, tatala le lafo o Fa'autagia. One faapea loa lea Tumua, o le tama e tele ona aiga, o le Tama a Aiga." - Orators of Tumua.

Through this careful process, it was revealed that Fuiavailili's biological father Fuimaono was both a relative of Fenunu'ivao and also a direct descendant of Queen Salamasina's second child, Tapumanaia (also known as Tapusatele). Through his ancestry and adoption, Tupua Fuiavailili united both Salamasina lineages through his biological ancestor and King Muagututi'a's ancestor Fofoaivao'ese, Salamasina's first child. Having satisfied the requirements of having strong linkages to Samoa's royal lineages and noble families, Fuiavailili was named Tupua and proclaimed as the first Tama a 'Āiga (lit.'son of the families') by the orators of Tumua, succeeding his adoptive father as the next King.

Reuniting the Royal Bloodlines: Salamasina to Tupua 
The ancestor of the Tupua Tamasese title was Samoa's first ruler to possess all four pāpā titles - Queen Salamasina. She was the daughter of Vaetofaga (a granddaughter of the Tu'i Tonga Kau'ulufonua II) and the Tui A'ana Tamaalelagi. She was entrusted to the care of Levalasi So'oa'emalelagi, wife of the Tui Atua Māta'utia. She was betrothed to marry Tonumaipe'a Tapumanaia in order to form a political alliance with the influential Tonumaipe'a faction in Savai'i. Salamasina instead, eloped with her love, Alapepe. This relationship brought forth a daughter named Fofoaivaoese, who grew to become Tuia‘ana and the ancestress of Fonoti and Tupua.

Alapepe, however, was pursued by the furious Tonumaipe‘a clan to the Tongan island of Tongatapu where he was killed for “defiling” the taupou. Salamāsina's son by Tapumanaia was named after his father and later received the Lesātele title of the Salani and Sālesātele villages in Falealili, thereafter known as Tapusatele.

In a twist of fate, the lines of both Fofoaivaoese and Tapusatele - Salamasina's heirs - were reunited by Tupua Fuiavailili, the first Tama-a-'Aiga. Tupua's biological father, Fuimaono, was a direct descendant of Tapusatele. His adoptive father, King Muagututi'a, was a direct descendant of Fofoaivaoese. Tupua Fuiavailili was thus the first King to be descended from Queen Salamasina through both her children, Fofoaivaoese and Tapusatele. The young untitled men of Falefa have thereafter been called Tupua ma le Aumaga (literally "Tupua and the young men"), marking the arrival of Tupua Fuiavailili to Falefa and his status as the young heir of King Muagututi'a, which would also have entailed duties as leader of the young untitled men. To this day, these young men stand guard at every bestowal ceremony and are responsible for guarding the chiefs of Falefa and the holder of the Tupua Tamasese title.

Fofoaivaoese, to Tupua 

 Queen Salamāsina (progenitor of Samoa's four main royal bloodlines)
 Queen Fofoaivaoese (first daughter of Queen Salamasina)
 Queen Taufau Asiata (daughter of Queen Fofoaivaoese)
 King Faumuinā (nephew of Queen Taufau)
 King Fonoti (Defeats siblings for Kingship)
 King Muagututi'a. (marries Fenunuivao, daughter of Leutele, of Falefa.)
 No children. *Fuiavailili is brought to Falefa and named heir to King Muagututi'a, Tupua Fuiavailili
 King Tupua Fuiavailili (the first Tupua and the first 'Tama-a-'aiga)

Tapusātele, to Tupua 

 Queen Salamāsina (progenitor of Samoa's four main royal bloodlines)
 Tapumanaia Tapusatele (marries Oilau, daughter of Leutele, of Falefa.)
 Sifuiva
 Fuimaono
 Fuiavailili
 Taken to Falefa and named, Tupua Fuiavailili. Becomes Tafa'ifā (King) Tupua Fuiavailili (the first Tupua' and the first Tama-a-'aiga)

Tupua's Aloali'i (Heirs apparent) 
Tupua would go on to sire children through different unions, all politically important to cement his reign. From his four usuga (marriages), King Tupua Fuiavailili had five children:

 Afoa (later named Afoafouvale, after his defeat in battle), of Palauli.
 Galumalemana, of Saleimoa (who later succeeded his brother Afoa as King by defeating him at Maauga, Leulumoega). Named after Galu and Mana and signifies the A'ana connection of later Tupua Tamasese. There are many current holders of the title.
 Luafalemana, of Falefā. Lineal ancestor of the Matā'afa Tama-a-Aiga line. The residence of Luafalemana remains at Falefa. There are no current holders of the title.
 Tautisusua and Tufugatasi.
All aloali'i title holders are eligible to hold the Tupua Tamasese title, subject to the approval of Aiga Sa Fenunuivao.

Appointment: the Aiga Sā Fenunuivao of Falefa & Salani 
When a Tupua is to be appointed, the descendants of Fenunu'ivao (adoptive mother of the first Tupua) meet to decide on who should hold the mantle. The Aiga Sā Fenunuivao (Fenunuivao's descendants) are the primary political family of the Sā Tupua clan, led by the Moeono of Falefa and Tofua'iofo'ia of Salani. The family holds authority and custodianship of the title, deciding who from among its heirs it should be bestowed upon. Once an appointment has been made, the orators of Lufilufi are informed to issue the proclamation.

The current holder, His Highness Tui Atua Tupua Tamasese Efi, is a direct descendant of Fenunu'ivao, Tupua Fuiavalili, his second son Galumalemana and his grandson, Nofoasaefā, of Asau, Savaii. Tupuola Efi was chosen as Tupua Tamasese by Aiga Sa Fenunu'ivao after the passing of his first cousin, former Prime Minister Tupua Tamasese Lealofi IV.

Moeono and Tofua'iofoia speak for Aiga Sa Fenunu'ivao, not only on matters pertaining to the Tupua title, but also on dealings with Samoa's other main political families, such as Sa Tuala and the other great family of Atua, Sa Levalasi. Tofua'iofoia and Moeono are members of the great council of Atua which meets at Lalogafu'afu'a, the meeting place of Atua's leaders in Lufilufi.

Notable Holders  

Tafa'ifa (King) Tupua Fuiavailili was the first of the Tupua and became King of Samoa in c.1550, succeeding his father King Muagututi'a, son of King Fonoti. He is the first descendant of Queen Salamasina to have brought together the royal lines of both her children - Queen Fofoaivaoese and Tapumanaia.
Tui Atua Tupua Tamasese Titimaea saw the restoration of the Salamasina lineage to prominence after a period of rule from the Manono-based Lei'ataua/Tamafaiga polity and Sa Malietoa, the last holder of the Tupu Tafa'ifa titles. It is the first time the Tamasese name appears alongside the tama-a-aiga Tupua title. Because of his prowess in war and popularity among the orators of Tumua, he was conferred the Tupua title. Among these qualities, he was known to be hospitable and generous (tama gāsese mea lelei), and the name Tamasese was derived from this appellation by which Titimaea and his descendants have been known ever since.
 Tupua Tamasese Lealofi III was the leader of the Mau Movement until his assassination by NZ armed forces during the Black Saturday massacre in 1929. Realizing that his death could spark a bloody war with NZ colonial forces, Tamasese called for peace and for the Mau to continue on with its passive resistance and civil disobedience. His final words were “My blood has been spilt for Samoa. I am proud to give it. Do not dream of avenging it, as it was spilt for peace."
 Tupua Tamasese Meaʻole - Samoa's co-head of state at the time of the country's independence in 1962 - served as Tupua Tamasese from 1929 until his death in 1963. Mea'ole was succeeded as Tupua Tamasese by his nephew - Tupua Tamasese Lealofi IV,
 Tui Atua Tupua Tamasese Lealofi IV (1922–1983). The nephew of Tupua Tamasese Mea'ole and elected 2nd Prime Minister of Samoa. Later ascended to the Council of Deputies.
 Tui Atua Tupua Tamasese Efi formerly served as the 3rd Prime Minister of Samoa. He was selected by Aiga Sa Fenunu'ivao to succeed his first cousin, Tupua Tamasese Lealofi IV in 1984. He was sworn in as Samoa's O le Ao o le Malo (Head of State) on June 16, 2007, until 2017. He is now a patron of the arts, culture and history and a celebrated scholar of Samoa.

Succession List: From Queen Salamasina to the first Tupua.

Queen Salamasina's Daughter, Fofoaivaoese, to Tupua 
Tafa'ifā Queen Salamāsina (progenitor of Samoa's four main royal bloodlines)

Tafa'ifā Queen Fofoaivaoese (first daughter of Queen Salamasina)

Tafa'ifā Queen Taufau Asiata (daughter of Queen Fofoaivaoese)

Le Tupufia (The King with only three pāpā) Faumuinā (nephew of Queen Taufau)

Tafa'ifā King Fonoti (Defeats siblings for Kingship; Fagaloa, Faleapuna and Falefa are rewarded with honours)

Tafa'ifā King Muagututi'a. (marries Fenunuivao, daughter of Leutele, of Falefa.)

 King Muagututi'a and Fenunuivao bear no children. Fuiavailili is brought to Falefa and named heir to King Muagututi'a. Given the name Tupua.

Tafa'ifā King Tupua Fuiavailili (the first Tupua and the first 'Tama-a-'aiga)

Queen Salamasina's Son, Tapumanaia II (Tapusatele), to Tupua 
Tafa'ifā Queen Salamāsina (progenitor of Samoa's four main royal bloodlines)

Tapumanaia (taken to Falealili and renamed Tapusatele; marries Sailau, daughter of Leutele, of Falefa.)

Tapufautua

Sifuiva

Fuimaono (marries Oilau, of Faleālili.)

Fuiavailili

 *Fuiavailili is taken to Falefa and named, Tupua Fuiavailili.

Tafa'ifā King Tupua Fuiavailili (the first Tupua and the first 'Tama-a-'aiga)

Sa Tupua: From King (Tafa'ifā) Tupua Fuiavailili to Tui Atua Tupua Tamasese Efi 
King Tupua Fuiavailili, descendant of Queen Salamasina, adopted son of King Muagututi'a and Fenunuivao, daughter of Leutele

King Afoa (defeated in single combat by his brother, Galumalemana. Thereafter named Afoafouvale, "he who rebels for no good reason.")

King Galumalemana (the Aloalii as an institution of succession is established under Galumalemana)

King Nofoasaefā (tyrant, assassinated by rebels in Savai'i)

King I'amafana (allegedly willed his kingdom to Malietoa Vainuupo but according to the Sa Tupua family, this is not true; succeeded by Safeofafine who was killed in combat; kingship passes from the Sa Tupua line to the Lei'ataua/Tamafaigā line)

1751 - 1830: Maeaeafe Mataafa

1830 - 1860: Leasiolagi Moegagogo

1860s - 1891: Tui Aana Tui Atua Tupua Tamasese Titimaea (restoration of the Sa Tupua/Salamasina lineage leads to theTamasese appellation being used hereafter with the Tupua title to become Tupua Tamasese)

1891 - 1915: Tui Atua Tupua Tamasese Lealofi-o-a'ana I, son of Tui Aana Tui Atua Tupua Tamasese Titimaea.

1915 - 1918: Tupua Tamasese Lealofi-o-a'ana II, eldest son of Tui Atua Tupua Tamasese Lealofi-o-a'ana I

1918 - 1929: Tupua Tamasese Lealofi-o'a'ana III (Mau leader, assassinated by NZ Soldiers during Black Saturday), younger brother of Tupua Tamasese Lealofi-o-a'ana II

1929 - 1963: Tupua Tamasese Mea'ole (Co-Head of State with Malietoa Tanumafili II after Independence), younger brother of Tupua Tamasese Lealofi-o-a'ana III

1963 - 1983: Tui Atua Tupua Tamasese Lealofi-o-a'ana IV (this is the first time Tamasese is formalised as part of the Tupua title) - Third Prime Minister of Samoa, son of Tupua Tamasese Lealofi-o-a'ana III

1986–present: Tui Atua Tupua Tamasese Efi  (Former Prime Minister and Head of State 2007–2017), son of Tupua Tamasese Mea'ole.

See also

Fa'amatai, chieflty system of Samoa.
Malietoa
Mata'afa
Tuimaleali'ifano
Tui Manu'a

References

Government of Samoa
Samoan chiefs